"Nutbush City Limits" is a semi-autobiographical song written by Tina Turner which commemorates her rural hometown of Nutbush in Haywood County, Tennessee, United States. Originally released as a single on United Artists Records in August 1973, it is one of the last hits that husband-wife R&B duo Ike & Tina Turner released together.

In the years since, "Nutbush City Limits" has been performed by a number of other artists, most notably Bob Seger and The Silver Bullet Band, and Turner herself has re-recorded several different versions of the song.

As an unincorporated rural community, Nutbush does not have official city limits; rather, its general boundaries are described by signs reading "Nutbush, Unincorporated" which are posted on the local highway (Tennessee State Route 19).

A line dance to the song, called the "Nutbush", created in the 1970s disco era, took off in Australia during the 1980s, and it has seen sustained success to this day, including gaining viral popularity internationally through TikTok.

Recording and release 
Produced by Ike Turner, "Nutbush City Limits" was recorded at the Turners' Bolic Sound recording studio in Inglewood, California in May 1973. The song is characterized by inventive guitar sounds, a clavinet, a substantial Moog synthesizer solo by Ike, and a funky brass section.

Typical of the period, none of the session musicians who contributed to "Nutbush City Limits" were given specific mention in the song credits. Alan Krigger, the future drummer of Giuffria, claimed being the drummer in an interview. It has been rumored for years that Marc Bolan, frontman for the glam rock band T. Rex, played guitar on the track. Gloria Jones, his girlfriend at the time—who herself provided backing vocals for Ike & Tina Turner during the 1960s—asserted that this was the case in the 2007 BBC4 documentary Marc Bolan: The Final Word. This claim is bolstered by the fact that Bolan toured the U.S. extensively and resided in the Los Angeles area during the mid-1970s, and is also acknowledged to have played on the Ike & Tina Turner singles "Sexy Ida (Part 2)" and "Baby—Get It On". However, a 2008 Ebony magazine article about Ike Turner's death identified James "Bino" Lewis, then a member of Ike & Tina's backing band Kings of Rhythm, as the guitarist. It has also been suggested that James Lewis is the guitarist on "Baby—Get It On".  But there are two guitars on that track: fuzz rhythm centre pan (which could be Bolan), with wah-wah guitar in the right channel, very typical of Afro-American playing like Lewis's.

Originally released as a single on United Artists Records in August 1973, it's one of the last hits that husband-wife R&B duo Ike & Tina Turner released together.

Reception and awards 

A reviewer for Cash Box (August 11, 1973) wrote:

The single was a hit in various countries, peaking at No. 11 on the Billboard R&B singles chart, No. 22 on the Billboard Hot 100, and No. 4 on the UK Singles Chart. It also reached No. 1 in Austria, and No. 2 in Switzerland and West Germany. In Australia, the single peaked at No. 14, spent 52 weeks in the top 100, and is still a party staple among Generation X and Y where it is accompanied by a dance of the same name.

The song was the lead single from album Nutbush City Limits, released in November 1973, which peaked at No. 22 on the Billboard R&B albums chart.

In 1973, the single was certified silver by the British Phonographic Industry (BPI) for selling a quarter of a million units. In 1974, the Turners received the first ever Golden European Award for selling more than one million records of "Nutbush City Limits" in Europe.

1988 live version 
Following the couple's split, the song became a staple of Tina's live show where she reworked the funky studio version into a hard-driving rock and roll showstopper. A live recording of "Nutbush City Limits" from Turner's 1986–1987 Break Every Rule Tour was released as the lead single to promote the 1988 double album Tina Live in Europe, but it was in fact a different recording than the one that appeared on the official concert album. While this version did not manage to register much of an impact on any charts, the single is notable for being one of the first by Turner to be released on compact disc, at that time a relatively new format, in addition to 7" and 3-track 12" vinyl editions.

Both the CD and 12" singles featured a 10-minute 57-second live rendition of ZZ Top's song "Legs" from their 1983 album Eliminator, which was not included on the Tina Live in Europe album. A shorter version of "Legs", recorded during Turner's 1993 What's Love? Tour, would later appear on her 1994 CD box set The Collected Recordings - Sixties to Nineties.

 "Nutbush City Limits" (live) – 
 Tina Live in Europe album track –

1991 remixes 
Turner re-recorded "Nutbush City Limits" in a modern dance style—subtitled "The 90s Version"—for inclusion on her 1991 compilation album Simply the Best. Upon its release as a single, the song peaked at No. 23 on the UK Singles Chart and was a Top 20 hit in several other European countries. A different rendition, entitled "Nutbush City Limits ('91)", appeared alongside "The 90s Version". This funkier yet more laid-back arrangement is actually the one for which Turner recorded new vocals that were later remixed by producers Chris "C. J." Mackintosh and Dave Dorrell to become "The 90s Version". The 12" single also featured an extended six-minute version of the dance remix, and a limited-release promotional DJ edition from the UK included still another take, "A Little Bit o' Bush". The corresponding music video for "The 90s Version" shows Turner recording the song in studio, intercut with footage of the various landmarks mentioned.

 "Nutbush City Limits (The 90s Version)" – 
 "Nutbush City Limits ('91)" – 
 "Nutbush City Limits (Nutbush City '91)" – 
 "A Little Bit o' Bush" –

1993 re-recording 
In 1993, Turner re-recorded the track as a re-working of the original studio arrangement for the What's Love Got to Do with It soundtrack album.

Charts

Weekly charts

Year-end charts

Certifications

Nutbush Dance 

The song has gained cult popularity in Australia, particularly due to the Nutbush dance. The dance is often performed at weddings, school concerts, and bushdances. Turner has never performed a version of the dance to the song. The origin of the Nutbush dance is unknown, but there has been some suggestion that the Nutbush is a modification of the Madison line dance.

In 2015, dancers in the Victorian town of Horsham set the first Guinness World Record for the number of people doing the Nutbush, with 254 dancers. On 19 October 2017, students at Rivermount College in Yatala, Queensland doubled this record with 522 dancers. On 12 July 2018 the record was broken again at The Big Red Bash, a music festival situated beneath the Big Red Dune on the edge of the Simpson Desert in outback Queensland. Crowds lined up to take part, dancing along to "Nutbush City Limits" as 1,719 people took part in the challenge. On 16 July 2019, a new record of 2,330 people performed the Nutbush at the Big Red Bash, breaking the previous year's record. The Big Red Bash 2022 again improved on previous participation number increasing to 4084 people.

Other versions

 Bob Seger and the Silver Bullet Band recorded "Nutbush City Limits" for their 1975 album Beautiful Loser. It was a mainstay of their concert performances as documented on the Live Bullet album, where they used it for the opening number. The Live Bullet version was released as a promotional single and became a Detroit-area hit.
 In 1980, Brian Johnson covered the song alongside "Whole Lotta Rosie" as part of his first audition for the band AC/DC.
 Alvin Lee and Steve Gould included a version of the song on their 1981 collaboration, RX5.
 Precious Wilson and La Mama recorded the song on their 1983 album Funky Fingers.
 Sam Brown released the song on the European release of her 1988 debut album Stop!.
 A rendition by Bloodloss appeared both on their 1988 album Human Skin Suit and as a B-side on the 1989 single release of "School's Out" by King Snake Roost.
 The German electronica group Boom Operators, fronted by Harald Blüchel, featured "Nutbush City Limits" on their 1991 album Hu-Man.
 Martin Barre, former guitarist for Jethro Tull, recorded a version of this song in 1992 for his first solo album, A Summer Band.
 NWOBHM act Girl recorded a version which appeared on their posthumously released third album Killing Time in 1997. 
 In 2005, the tune was also played by Nashville Pussy and can be heard on their album Get Some!.
 On May 15, 2007, American Idol contestant Melinda Doolittle sang the song in her second Top 3 performances; she received excellent marks from all three judges.
 Pearl Aday performed the song as part of her band's opening set for her father Meat Loaf's Casa de Carne Tour in 2008.
 Black Diamond Heavies featured this song as the opening track of their 2009 album A Touch of Someone Else's Class.
 Australian country singer Nicki Gillis included the song on her 2011 album Woman of Substance; she also played it at the end of each show during her 2011 UK concert tour.
 In 2013, Naya Rivera performed the song as her character Santana Lopez in the fourth-season episode "Diva" of the television series Glee.
 In 2013, Beth Hart and Joe Bonamassa included the song on the album Seesaw.
 In 2017, Australian new wave band Pseudo Echo covered the song.
 Welsh heavy metal band Budgie included a cover of the song on their album The Last Stage.
 Australian pop singer Mia Wray covered the song during an encore performance at the Corner Hotel in Richmond, Victoria on 25 February 2022. Michael Prebeg of The Music described the cover as "wildly entertaining".

References

External links 
"Nutbush City Limits" at Discogs
lyrics
Nutbush City Limits at 45Cat.com

1973 songs
1973 singles
1988 singles
1991 singles
Ike & Tina Turner songs
Tina Turner songs
Bob Seger songs
Song recordings produced by Ike Turner
Funk rock songs
United Artists Records singles
Capitol Records singles
Songs written by Tina Turner
Number-one singles in Austria